Hondo may refer to:

Places 

 Rio Hondo (disambiguation), the name of several locations, derived from the Spanish word for "deep"

Canada 
Hondo, Alberta, an unincorporated community

United States 
 Hondo, New Mexico, an unincorporated community
 Hondo, Texas, a city
 Hondo Creek, Texas

Japan 
 Hondo, Kumamoto, a former city, merged into the new city of Amakusa in 2006
 Honshū, Japan's main island, historically called

Arts and entertainment
 Hondo (film), 1953 Western film starring John Wayne
 Hondo (novel), novelization of the film by Louis L'Amour
 Hondo (TV series), a 1967 television version

People

As a nickname
 Charles C. Campbell (general) (1948-2016), United States Army
 John Havlicek (1940–2019), U.S. basketball player with the Boston Celtics
 Frank Howard (baseball) (born 1936), U.S. baseball player and coach

As a surname
 Ammi Hondo (born 1997), Japanese para-alpine skier
 Daniel Hondo (born 1982), former cricketer and current rugby union player from Zimbabwe
 Danilo Hondo (born 1974), German professional cyclist
 Douglas Hondo (born 1979), Zimbabwean cricketer
 , Japanese voice actress
 Med Hondo (1936-2019), Mauritanian film director, producer, screenwriter and actor
 Santiago Hondo (born 1974), Equatoguinean former footballer
 , Japanese baseball player and manager

Fictional characters
 Hondo MacLean, a character in the cartoon M.A.S.K. (TV series)
 Hondo Ohnaka, a pirate in the Star Wars universe
 Piston Hondo, in Nintendo's Punch-Out!! video game series
 Lt. Dan "Hondo" Harrelson, in S.W.A.T. (1975 TV series) and S.W.A.T. (2003 film)
 Sgt. Daniel "Hondo" Harrelson Jr., in S.W.A.T. (2017 TV series)

Other uses 
 Cyclone Hondo, a 2008 Indian Ocean cyclone
 Hondo (guitar company)
 Hondo Railway, a short railroad west of San Antonio, Texas
 Hondō, the Main Hall of worship of some Japanese Buddhist temples
 HONDO, computational chemistry software program
 Hondo, an eyelet at the end of a lariat rope through which the other end runs to make a loop

Japanese-language surnames